The 2017 Metro Atlantic Athletic Conference baseball tournament was held from May 24 through 28.  The top six regular season finishers of the league's eleven teams met in the double-elimination tournament to be held at Sal Maglie Stadium in Niagara Falls, New York.   won their sixth tournament championship and earned the conference's automatic bid to the 2017 NCAA Division I baseball tournament.

Seeding
The top six teams were seeded one through six based on their conference winning percentage. They then played a double-elimination tournament.

Results

All-Tournament Team
The following players were named to the All-Tournament Team.

Most Valuable Player
Tony Romanelli, a junior pitcher for Marist, was named Tournament Most Valuable Player.  He earned the save in each of Marist's three wins, including a four pitch strikeout in the final after entering with two outs and the bases loaded in the top of the ninth inning.

References

Tournament
Metro Atlantic Athletic Conference Baseball Tournament
2017 in sports in New York (state)